Morales de Campos is a municipality located in the province of Valladolid, Castile and León, Spain. According to the 2004 census (INE), the municipality has a population of 179 inhabitants.

References

External links 
 Morales de Campos in Argentina!

Municipalities in the Province of Valladolid